Thomas Naogeorgus (Thomas Kirchmeyer, Kirchmair, Neubauer; 21 December 1508 – 29 December 1563) was a Latin dramatist, humanist, Protestant theologian, Protestant reformer, preacher and pamphleteer of the German Renaissance.

Naogeorgus was born in Straubing.  His dramatic works were very influential in the German Reformation. He was greatly influenced by Martin Luther, but his teachings stand independent of Lutheranism, and the publication of his exegesis of 1 John was opposed by Luther and Melanchthon.  He died, aged 55, in Wiesloch.

Works 

 Pammachius, 1538
 Mercator seu judicium, tragedy, 1540
 Incendia seu Pyrgopolinices, drama, 1541
 Hamanus, tragedy, 1543
 Carmen de bello Germanico, poems, 1548
 Epitome ecclesiasticorum dogmatum, 1548
 Agricultura sacra, 1550
 Hieremias, tragedy, 1551
 Iudas Iscariotes, drama, 1552
 Satyrarum libri quinque, 1555
 Regnum papisticum, 1555
 De dissidiis componendis, ad Mathiam Bredenbachium, ludimagistrum Embricensem, Basilaeae 1559.

His collected works were edited by  Hans-Gert Roloff (Berlin 1975-).

Literature 

 Franz Krojer: Naogeorg, in: Aufschluss des Gäubodens, München 2006 (Differenz-Verlag), (PDF)
 Leonhard Theobald: Thomas Naogeorgus, der Tendenzdramatiker der Reformationszeit (Neue kirchliche Zeitschrift 17, 1906,  764–794; 18, 1907, 65–90, 327-350, 409–425).
 A. Hübner. Studien zu Naogeorgus (Zeitschrift für deutsches Altertum 54, 1913,  297–338; 57, 1920, 193-222).
 P. H. Diehl. Die Dramen des Thomas Naogeorgus in ihrem Verhältnis zur Bibel und zu Luther, n 1915.
 Leonhard Theobald: Zur Lebensgeschichte des Thomas Naogeorgus, Zeitschrift für Bayrische Kirchengeschichte 6, 1931,  143-165.
 H. Levinger: Die Bühne des Thomas Naogeorgus, Archiv für Reformationsgeschichte 32, 1935,  145-166.
 Leonhard Theobald: Das Leben und Wirken des Tendenzdramatikers der Reformationszeit Thomas Naogeorgus seit seiner Flucht aus Sachsen, Leipzig 1908.
 Fritz Wiener: Naogeorgus im England der Reformationszeit (1913).
 
 
 
 
 

1508 births
1563 deaths
People from Straubing
16th-century German Protestant theologians
German male non-fiction writers
16th-century Latin-language writers
German male dramatists and playwrights
16th-century German male writers